The 2021 UCI Mountain Bike World Championships were held from 25 to 29 August 2021 in Val di Sole, Italy.

Medal summary

Medal Table

Men's events

Women's events

Team events

Under-23 and Junior events

References 

UCI Mountain Bike World Championships
World Championships
2021 in Italian sport
International sports competitions hosted by Italy
Mountain biking events in Italy
UCI